Puerto Rico Highway 501 (PR-501) is a tertiary state highway in Ponce, Puerto Rico. The road runs north to south, and mostly alongside Rio Pastillo in barrio Marueño. It southern terminus is at PR-123, just off Calle 18 of Urbanizacion Las Delicias in barrio Magueyes, and its northern end is also at PR-123 but in barrio Guaraguao.

Major intersections

See also

 List of highways in Ponce, Puerto Rico
 List of highways numbered 501

References

External links
 
 Guía de Carreteras Principales, Expresos y Autopistas 

501
Roads in Ponce, Puerto Rico